Euclid Court is a bungalow court located at 545 S. Euclid Ave. in Pasadena, California. The court consists of eight residential units in five buildings surrounding a central courtyard. The court was built in 1921; however, one house in the court was built in 1888 and later incorporated into the court's design. The homes were designed by the Postle Company in the Tudor Revival style; their designs feature half-timbered facades, porches with brick walls, and stucco chimneys. Both gable and jerkinhead roofs were used to top the houses.

The court was added to the National Register of Historic Places on July 11, 1983.

References

External links

Bungalow courts
Bungalow architecture in California
Houses in Pasadena, California
National Register of Historic Places in Pasadena, California
Houses on the National Register of Historic Places in California
Tudor Revival architecture in California
Houses completed in 1888
Houses completed in 1921